Web Technology Group was a technology consultancy and solutions provider to the UK Public Sector, specialising in the design, build and management of secure, high value and complex web applications, based in London, UK. WTG was purchased by Civica in 2015.

History
Originally known as Hyperlink, then as hyperlink-interactive, Web Technology Group was acquired by Cable & Wireless in 2000. Web Technology Group remained a subsidiary of Cable & Wireless until its sale in February 2007 at which time it became an independent organisation. It is a UK company based in Hammersmith. It is known for building  and operating systems such as Impact Nominal Index and was voted most efficient technical agency in the New Media Age 100 for 2008.

One of the most successful projects in Web Technology Group's recent history was their involvement in the online version of the 2011 UK Census, working in collaboration with Lockheed Martin and Cable & Wireless.

Web Technology Group also ran the Coalclaims site on behalf of Department for Business, Enterprise and Regulatory Reform (BERR).

This was the biggest personal injury scheme in British legal history and possibly the world, settling around 10,000 claims a month at their peak for ex-miners in the UK. Over 760,000 claims are registered and £3.9 billion in compensation has been paid to date.

Client projects
A complete listing of the company's clients is hard to find, but those that are in the public domain include those at the Case Studies Archive.

Public sector
Coalclaims for Department for Energy and Climate Change (DECC) who are a government body who were spun out of BERR in 2008.
Impact Nominal Index
College of Policing
Metropolitan Police Service
Department of Health
Court Services for Ministry of Justice (United Kingdom)
The Home Office
Transport for London
Office for National Statistics
Middlesbrough Borough Council
Bristol Council
Residential Property Tribunal Service
Money Advisory Service (formerly CFEB)
The National Archives
BBC
Business Link

Private sector
Vodafone
Experian
Legal and General
Baker Tilly
Citibank
Bluecycle
J. C. Penney
Etihad
Serco

References

External links

C&W annual report detailing the sale of WTG

Companies based in the London Borough of Hammersmith and Fulham
Software companies established in 1995
Management consulting firms of the United Kingdom
Software companies of the United Kingdom